Radovo is a village in the municipality of Bosilovo, North Macedonia. It is located near Strumica

Demographics
According to the 2002 census, the village had a total of 851 inhabitants. The vast majority (97%) of the villagers are Catholic (Eastern). Ethnic groups in the village include:

Macedonians 834
Turks 16
Others 1

Radovo is home to business that in 20 years grew into the country's biggest dairy company.

Sports
Local football club FK Napredok recently played in the Macedonian Third League.

References

See also
 Bosilovo Municipality
 Bosilovo
 Strumica

Villages in Bosilovo Municipality